Libbie J. Masterson (born 1969) is an American photographer and installation artist.

In 2013, she installed a public artwork of  80 illuminated floating lily sculptures on Houston's Hermann Park lake. Masterson's public artworks also include pieces installed at the George Bush Intercontinental Airport and the Hobby Airport, Houston.

Her work is included in the collection of the Museum of Fine Arts, Houston.

References

1969 births
20th-century American women artists
21st-century American women artists
20th-century American photographers
21st-century American photographers
Living people